is an underground metro station located in Chikusa-ku, Nagoya, Aichi Prefecture, Japan operated by the Nagoya Municipal Subway's Higashiyama Line. It is located 15.1 rail kilometers from the terminus of the Higashiyama Line at Takabata Station.

History
Higashiyama Kōen Station was opened on 1 April 1963. The wicket gates were automated to use the Manaca smart card system from 11 February 2011.

Lines 

 (Station number: H17)

Layout 
Higashiyama Kōen Station has a single underground island platform.

Platforms

References

External links

 Higashiyama Kōen Station official web site 

Chikusa-ku, Nagoya
Railway stations in Japan opened in 1963
Railway stations in Aichi Prefecture